Christian Wolanin (born March 17, 1995) is a Canadian-born American professional ice hockey player currently playing for the  Vancouver Canucks of the National Hockey League (NHL). Wolanin was selected by the Ottawa Senators in the fourth round, 107th overall, in the 2015 NHL Entry Draft.

Playing career
Wolanin began his hockey career with the Green Bay Gamblers and Muskegon Lumberjacks in the United States Hockey League (USHL). While with the Lumberjacks, Wolanin was named to the USHL Second All-Star Team. After playing in the USHL, Wolanin committed to the University of North Dakota.

While majoring in communications at North Dakota, Wolanin played in 32 games during his freshman season, and ranked third in the conference among rookie defensemen in scoring as UND won the national championship. He was named to the NCHC Academic All-Conference Team at the conclusion of the season. In his sophomore season, Wolanin tied for fifth amongst NCHC defensemen in scoring but led all conference defensemen during the playoffs. Wolanin helped the Fighting Hawks qualify for the 2017 Frozen Faceoff after he recorded the game-tying goal in game two of the NCHC Quarterfinals against the St. Cloud Huskies to send the game to overtime.

After playing three seasons with the North Dakota Fighting Hawks, Wolanin signed a two-year entry level contract with the Senators. He made his NHL debut on March 22, 2018, in a 6–2 loss to the Edmonton Oilers. He scored his first NHL goal April 2, 2018 in a game against the Winnipeg Jets.

Wolanin spent the beginning of the 2018–19 season with the Senators American Hockey League (AHL) affiliate, the Belleville Senators, but was recalled to the NHL on October 25. On January 23, 2019, Wolanin was added to the 2019 AHL All-Star Game roster.

On July 4, 2019, Wolanin was signed to a two-year, $1.8 million contract extension with the final year on a one-way basis. Wolanin was hampered by injuries throughout the duration of his two-year contract. While in his final season under contract in the pandemic delayed 2020–21 season, Wolanin was traded by the Senators to the Los Angeles Kings in exchange for Michael Amadio on March 29, 2021.

Wolanin re-signed with the Kings on July 6, 2021, agreeing to a one-year, $750,000 contract extension. After attending the Kings 2021 training camp, Wolanin remained on the roster to open the  season. Before making an appearance, Wolanin was placed on waivers and subsequently claimed by the Buffalo Sabres on October 16, 2021. Wolanin remained with the Sabres as added blueline depth insurance featuring in a lone contest, going scoreless in a 5–3 defeat to the Washington Capitals on November 8, 2021. Wolanin's brief tenure with the Sabres ended on December 1, 2021, after he was re-claimed off waivers by the Kings and was immediately re-assigned to AHL affiliate, the Ontario Reign.

As a free agent in the following off-season, Wolanin was signed to a one-year, two-way contract with the Vancouver Canucks on July 14, 2022.

Personal life
Wolanin's father, Craig, played in 695 NHL games and won a Stanley Cup with the Colorado Avalanche in 1996. As a result of his father's career, Wolanin lived in Quebec City, Denver, Tampa and Toronto before his family permanently settled in Rochester, Michigan. He is a dual citizen of both Canada and the United States. and chose to play for the U.S. national team for the first time at the 2019 IIHF World Championship.

Career statistics

Regular season and playoffs

International

Awards and honors

References

External links
 

1995 births
Living people
Abbotsford Canucks players
American men's ice hockey defensemen
Belleville Senators players
Buffalo Sabres players
Canadian ice hockey defencemen
Canadian people of American descent
Green Bay Gamblers players
Ice hockey players from Michigan
Ice hockey people from Quebec City
Los Angeles Kings players
Muskegon Lumberjacks players
North Dakota Fighting Hawks men's ice hockey players
Ontario Reign (AHL) players
Ottawa Senators players
Ottawa Senators draft picks
People from Rochester, Michigan
Vancouver Canucks players